High Blast Explosive, or HBX, is an explosive used as a bursting charge in missile warheads, mines, depth bombs, depth charges, and torpedoes.

History
It was developed during World War II as a desensitized modification of Torpex explosives.

Properties
It is an aluminized (powdered aluminum) explosive having the same order of sensitivity as Composition B.

Tests indicate that it is about 98% to 100% as powerful as Torpex, that it is definitely less sensitive than Torpex in both laboratory impact and bullet impact, that it is slightly more sensitive in these respects than TNT, and that it is about the same order as Composition B.

A difficulty with HBX is that it produces gas and builds up pressure in the case during stowage. It was discovered that adding calcium chloride to the mixture will absorb all the moisture and eliminate the production of gas.

Composition
There are three types of HBX explosives: HBX-1, HBX-3, and H-6. Below is each type's "Grade A" composition based on weight:

 HBX-1

 HBX-3

 H-6

References 

Explosives